Wedgemount Lake is a turquoise-coloured alpine lake located in Garibaldi Provincial Park of British Columbia, Canada. It is situated below Wedge Mountain, Parkhurst Mountain, Rethel Mountain, and Mount Weart. Meltwater from Wedgemount Glacier and Armchair Glacier feeds the lake, whereas Wedgemount Creek is the outflow from the lake.

See also
Cascade Volcanoes
Garibaldi Lake volcanic field
Garibaldi Volcanic Belt
Garibaldi Provincial Park

External links

BC Parks: Garibaldi Provincial Park
 LiveTrails: Wedgemount Lake Noticeboard
 Outdoor Vancouver: Wedgemount Lake Hiking Route

Lakes of British Columbia
Sea-to-Sky Corridor
New Westminster Land District